DIXY (Дикси) is Russia's third largest food retail company. The Moscow-based company and its subsidiaries specialize in sale of food and everyday products. DIXY is a subsidiary of DKBR MEGA RETAIL GROUP LIMITED.

The DIXY main competitors are X5 Retail Group, Magnit, Metro Group, Auchan and others.

History  
The company was founded in 1992 in Saint Petersburg and began its expansion in 1999 when it opened a store in Moscow and from there began to expand to other regions of the country.

The company delisted from the Moscow Exchange in 2017.

On July 22, 2021, PJSC Magnit completed the purchase of the DIXY retail chain, which manages 2,477 stores in Russia. The brand was retained and the business continued to operate as a separate legal entity.

Stores and assets
As of January 2023, the Group operated 2,650 stores, including 2,209 Dixy discounters and 441 First Business franchisees. The geography of the Group's activities covers three federal districts of Russia - Central, North-Western and Far East.

The number of the company's staff as of January 2023 is about 26 thousand people.

References

External links 
 

Companies formerly listed on the Moscow Exchange
Food and drink companies based in Moscow
Retail companies established in 1992
Retail companies of Russia
Russian brands
Food retailers of Russia
Convenience stores